Tiger Cage is a 1988 Hong Kong action film directed by Yuen Woo-ping and starring Simon Yam, Carol Cheng, Jacky Cheung, Irene Wan and Donnie Yen. The film was followed by a sequel, Tiger Cage 2, released two years later in 1990 featuring a new storyline, with Yuen returning as director and cast members Yen and Cheng returning in different roles.

Plot
Inspector Michael Huang, alongside Shirley Ho, Brother Lung, Fan Chun-yau, Uncle Tat and Terry are all part of the Anti-Drug Unit of the Royal Hong Kong Police Force. The relationship between them are like brothers in general. During an operation, they worked together to bust a drug den but the chief drug trafficker, Swatow Hung, escaped. Just as they were celebrating their success, Hung found them and killed Lung. In order to avenge Lung and find Hung, they took a variety of means and finally found and killed Hung. During an accident, Yau filmed Tat trading with a drug trafficker and tells Terry and Michael. After Michael found out, in order to protect himself, he killed Terry and framed Yau, who was then suspended from duty, which caused Yau to feel suspicious.

One day, Yau's girlfriend Amy found a copy of Yau's videotape at home and discovered that Michael and Tat were accomplices. Shortly after Yau and Michael arrive to pick up the tape, but in order to save Yau, she handed the tape to Michael. Michael then ordered an assassin to kill her. But Amy was able to call Shirley and inform her of Michael's operations. At this point, Yau and Shirley discover the truth to everything, that Hung luckily escaped from the drug bust earlier and came back to revenge on Lung, who was an undercover cop, on the night before his wedding with Shirley. Yau vows to bring the perpetrator to justice and dig out the mole inside the police force. Terry, who was partners with Tat, discovered his relationship with the drug traffickers and conflicted for his loyalty to Tat or his ethnic standards. Tat was used by his superior Michael and was ultimately abandoned and killed. Shirley finally discovers the truth to the case, but now, it is difficult for all of them to escape death.

Cast

Box office
The film earned HK$11,534,315 at the Hong Kong box office during its theatrical run from 28 July to 10 August 1988 in Hong Kong.

References

External links
 
 Tiger Cage at Hong Kong Cinemagic
 

1988 films
1980s action thriller films
1980s crime thriller films
1988 martial arts films
Hong Kong action thriller films
Hong Kong crime thriller films
Hong Kong martial arts films
Kung fu films
Gun fu films
Police detective films
1980s Cantonese-language films
Films directed by Yuen Woo-ping
Films about the illegal drug trade
Hong Kong films about revenge
Films set in Hong Kong
Films shot in Hong Kong
1980s Hong Kong films